Leif Bergdahl (born 1941) is a Swedish physician and former member of the now defunct right-wing political party New Democracy. He served at the Riksdag, Swedish Parliament.

Biography
Bergdahl was born in 1941. He has a degree in medicine and was promoted to the title of associate professor in medicine. He was a member of the New Democracy and was elected to the Riksdag in the 1991 general election. He served at the Riksdag between September 1991 and October 1994. During his term he was part of the special pension working group.

He was one of the shareholders of the mining company Northland which went bankrupt in 2015.

References

1941 births
Living people
20th-century Swedish physicians
New Democracy (Sweden) politicians
Members of the Riksdag 1991–1994
21st-century Swedish physicians
21st-century Swedish businesspeople